Dolní Město is a municipality and village in Havlíčkův Brod District in the Vysočina Region of the Czech Republic. It has about 900 inhabitants.

Administrative parts
Villages and hamlets of Dobrá Voda Lipnická, Loukov, Meziklasí, Rejčkov and Smrčensko are administrative parts of Dolní Město.

References

Villages in Havlíčkův Brod District